Monastyr is a rural locality (a village) in Dobryansky District, Perm Krai, Russia. The population was 9 as of 2010.

Geography 
Monastyr is located 55 km northeast of Dobryanka (the district's administrative centre) by road. Berdnikovshchina is the nearest rural locality.

References 

Rural localities in Dobryansky District